William George Zane Jr. (born February 24, 1966) is an American actor. His breakthrough role was in the 1989 Australian film Dead Calm, a performance that earned him a nomination for the Chicago Film Critics Association Award for Most Promising Actor. He has since appeared in numerous films and television series, notably playing the main antagonist Caledon Hockley in the epic romance disaster film Titanic (1997), for which he was nominated for a Screen Actors Guild Award.

Zane's other film roles include Kit Walker / The Phantom in the superhero film The Phantom (1996), "Match" in the Back to the Future franchise, Lieutenant Val Kozlowski in Memphis Belle (1990), The Collector in Demon Knight (1995), Curtis Zampf in The Believer (2001), and Richard Miller in the Sniper film series. He also played the recurring role of John Justice Wheeler in the second season of the TV series Twin Peaks, and provided the voice of Ansem in the video game Kingdom Hearts (2002).

Early life
Zane was born in Chicago, Illinois, to Thalia and William George Zane Sr., both of whom were professional actors and founders of a school for medical technicians. His parents are both of Greek descent (from Chios through his mother and Mani through his father), and his family's original surname, "Zanetakos", was anglicized to "Zane" by his parents, who also raised him in the Greek Orthodox faith. He has an older sister, Lisa Zane, who is an actress and singer.

After completing a year abroad in Switzerland at The American School in Switzerland (TASIS), Zane graduated from Francis W. Parker School and attended Harand Camp of the Theater Arts, located in Elkhart Lake, Wisconsin.

Career

1980s
Zane's first two screen roles were in the science fiction films Back to the Future in 1985 and Critters in 1986, around the same time he appeared in the music videos for Sheena Easton's songs "Do It For Love" and "Magic of Love".  In 1988, he played Tony Gambini alongside Jessica Fletcher in Murder, She Wrote: A Very Good Year for Murder. Zane also appeared in an episode of Matlock entitled "The Nurse". In 1989 he reprised his henchman role in Back to the Future Part II. Earlier that same year, Zane gained international recognition with the role of villain Hughie Warriner in the thriller Dead Calm, alongside Nicole Kidman and Sam Neill. He also starred in the NBC film The Case of the Hillside Stranglers (1989), and Adam Sandler's "no budget" debut Going Overboard (1989) which was not released to a wider audience until 1996.

1990s
Zane's first starring role was in a 1990 independent film, the low budget science fiction thriller Megaville. In 1990, he also co-starred in the film Memphis Belle, a film version of a 1944 film about a World War II Boeing B-17 Flying Fortress bomber, as the bombardier. Zane also forayed into television work, and in 1991 he appeared as John Justice Wheeler in several episodes of David Lynch's hit TV-show Twin Peaks. In 1992 Zane co-starred alongside Tilda Swinton in the film adaptation of Virginia Woolf's novel Orlando. In 1993, he played the Shakespearean actor "Mr. Fabian" in Tombstone, took a starring role in Sniper was also in Lake Consequence and played a playboy named Harry, posing as the elusive, albeit fake Damon Bradley alongside Marisa Tomei and Robert Downey Jr. in Only You.

He also starred in a couple of Tales from the Crypt productions, including Tales From the Crypt Presents: Demon Knight, where he played a henchman of Satan called The Collector, and the episode "Well-Cooked Hams", where he played a poorly skilled magician who killed to steal good tricks from other magicians. In 1996, Zane played the eponymous classic comic book hero in the big budget action film The Phantom, based on Lee Falk's comic.

Zane played the snobbish millionaire misanthrope Caledon Hockley in James Cameron's 1997 blockbuster Titanic. This role as Rose's (played by Kate Winslet) fiancé earned him an MTV Movie Award nomination for "Best Villain" and a Blockbuster Entertainment Award. He was also nominated for a SAG award.

In 1998, he starred in and produced I Woke Up Early the Day I Died, a silent film based on Ed Wood's last script, intended as a parody on bad filmmaking. He won several awards at the B-Movie Film Festival, including Best Movie and Best Actor, for this work. The year after, he starred opposite Timothy Dalton, Bruce Payne, Sean Pertwee and Leonor Varela (who became his fiancé after shooting ended) in a TV-movie about Cleopatra. Zane played the part of Mark Antony.

The same year, he voiced John Rolfe in Disney's Pocahontas II: Journey to a New World and Etrigan the Demon in an episode of The New Batman Adventures.

2000s

Zane was instrumental in realizing the critically acclaimed film The Believer, which won the Grand Jury Prize at Sundance Film Festival in 2001. In it, he portrayed neo-Nazi Curtis Zampf, and starred opposite Ryan Gosling. The same year, he also had a cameo as himself in the comedy Zoolander.

Zane appeared on Broadway in Chicago, where he played lawyer Billy Flynn.

Zane also had a recurring role in the television series Charmed in which he played poetry-loving ex-demon Drake. He also provided the voice of Ansem, the main antagonist of the 2002 video game Kingdom Hearts, opposite Haley Joel Osment. Though archive audio of Zane was later used for Kingdom Hearts: Chain of Memories, he was replaced by Richard Epcar for the rest of the series from Kingdom Hearts II onwards. Zane's performance, however, was kept for the Kingdom Hearts Final Mix remaster in Kingdom Hearts HD 1.5 ReMix.

In 2006, Zane starred in Arthur Allan Seidelman's  West End production of Six Dance Lessons in Six Weeks as an acerbic gay dance instructor opposite Claire Bloom.  The same year, he appeared in the Turkish film Valley of the Wolves Iraq (Kurtlar Vadisi: Irak in Turkish), part of the Kurtlar Vadisi franchise. The film tells the story of the U.S. Army run amok in Iraq, eventually brought into check by a Turkish soldier. Zane plays Sam William Marshall, a cruel U.S. soldier who is the main antagonist in the film.

He took over Timothy Olyphant's role as Christina Applegate's ex-boyfriend on Samantha Who?. The show, however, was not renewed for the 2009–2010 season.

Zane is a principal at RadioactiveGiant, a film and television production and distribution company.

2010s
Zane starred in the 2012 action/thriller film The Kill Hole, and in January 2017 he appeared in a commercial for KFC as a gold-colored Colonel Sanders to pitch the restaurant chain's newest limited-time flavor, Georgia Gold Honey Mustard BBQ chicken. Zane also appeared in an episode of Community,  season 6's "Advanced Safety Features".

Zane was also featured in two episodes of The Boys portraying a fictional version of himself who made a movie with Popclaw and also attended a comic convention with Tara Reid. In season 3, Zane appeared as himself portraying Alastair Adana in the Vought film Not Without My Dolphin'.

Personal life
Zane was married to actress Lisa Collins from 1989 until 1995. He was also engaged for a time to Chilean actress Leonor Varela, his co-star in the television film Cleopatra (1999).

Zane was later engaged to marry British model-turned-actress Kelly Brook, whom he met when they co-starred in the movie Survival Island (2005), also known as Three. They split in April 2008, got back together again shortly thereafter, then ended the relationship in August 2008. Zane dated Croatian model Jasmina Hdagha in 2010, but they broke up later that year.

Through a friend he met  American model Candice Neil who is the mother of his two daughters and to whom he got engaged. Their first daughter, Ava Catherine, was born in 2011, and their second daughter, Gia, was born in 2014.

In 1999, Zane participated in the first Gumball 3000 rally, driving a 1964 Aston Martin DB5.

Zane is also an abstract expressionist painter. He has had numerous solo and group exhibitions.

Other media projects
Zane executive-produced a CD by bluesman Tim O'Connor that includes three songs from Dead Calm'', in which Zane had one of the lead roles.

Filmography

Film

Television

Video games

Music videos

References

External links

 
 
 

1966 births
Living people
20th-century American male actors
21st-century American male actors
American male film actors
American male stage actors
American male television actors
American male video game actors
American male voice actors
American people of Greek descent
Greek Orthodox Christians from the United States
Male actors from Chicago
American expatriates in England
American expatriates in Switzerland
Francis W. Parker School (Chicago) alumni